João Cunha (1939 – 14 November 2020) was a Brazilian politician who served as a Deputy.

References

1939 births
2020 deaths
Brazilian politicians